Nam Khuan is a watercourse of Thailand. It is a tributary of the Yom River, part of the Chao Phraya River basin.

Khuan